The Gold Medal Award for Distinguished Archaeological Achievement is awarded by the Archaeological Institute of America in "recognition of a scholar who has made distinguished contributions to archaeology through his or her fieldwork, publications, and/or teaching."

It is the Institute's highest award.  First awarded in 1965, it has been awarded annually since 1969.

List of AIA Gold Medal winners 
2022: Elizabeth Fentress
2021: Katherine M.D. Dunbabin
2020: Jack L. Davis, University of Cincinnati
2019:Curtis Runnels, Boston University
2018:Ian Hodder, Stanford University
2017:John R. Clarke, University of Texas at Austin
2016:Malcolm Bell III, University of Virginia
2015: Charles Brian Rose
2014: L. Hugh Sackett
2013: Jeremy B. Rutter
2012: Lawrence Richardson Jr.
2011: Susan Irene Rotroff
2010: John Humphrey
2009: Henry Tutwiler Wright
2008: James Wiseman
2007: Larissa Bonfante
2006: Maria C. Shaw and Joseph W. Shaw
2005: Lionel Casson
2004: David B. Stronach
2003: Philip Betancourt
2002: Robert McCormick Adams
2001: Emmett L. Bennett Jr.
1999: Patty Jo Watson
1998: Anna Marguerite McCann
1997: Clemency Chase Coggins
1996: Wilhelmina F. Jashemski
1995: R. Ross Holloway
1994: Emeline Richardson
1993: Charles Kaufman Williams, II
1992: Evelyn Byrd Harrison
1991: Machteld J. Mellink
1990: John W. Hayes
1989: Virginia R. Grace
1988: Brunilde Sismondo Ridgway and John Desmond Clark
1987: Dorothy Burr Thompson
1986: George F. Bass
1985: Saul S. Weinberg and Gladys Davidson Weinberg
1984: Margaret Thompson
1983: James Bennet Pritchard
1982: Peter H. von Blanckenhagen
1981: William Andrew McDonald
1980: John Langdon Caskey
1979: Dows Dunham
1978: George M.A. Hanfmann
1977: Lucy Shoe Meritt
1976: Edith Porada
1975: Eugene Vanderpool
1974: Margarete Bieber
1973: Gordon R. Willey
1972: Homer A. Thompson
1971: Robert John Braidwood
1970: George E. Mylonas
1969: Oscar Theodore Broneer, Rhys Carpenter, and William B. Dinsmoor Jr.
1968: Gisela M. A. Richter
1967: William Foxwell Albright
1966: Hetty Goldman
1965: Carl W. Blegen

See also
 Gold medal
 Gold medal awards
 List of history awards
 List of archaeology awards

References

External links
Gold Medal Awards Archaeological Institute of America web site

Archaeology awards
American awards
Awards established in 1965